Semmangudi  or sembangudi  is a village in Kodavasal taluk, Tiruvarur district, Tamil Nadu. It is the home of many carnatic singers. The popular carnatic singer Semmangudi Srinivasa Iyer, is from this town.pin code:612603

Demographics 

As per the 2001 census, Semmangudi had a population of 1440 with 774 males and 716 females. The sex ratio was 989 and the literacy rate, 70.89.

References 
 

Villages in Tiruvarur district